The Analyst is an independent newspaper published in Liberia, based in Monrovia. Run by two journalists, its aim is to "provide thoughtful, balanced news and encourage civil society in governance and the press". It is considered one of the top sources for political issues in Liberia.

See also
 List of newspapers in Liberia

References

External links
Official website

Newspapers published in Liberia
Mass media in Monrovia